Urszula Radwańska was the defending champion, but decided not to participate that year.

Stéphanie Dubois became the first Canadian women to win this title, defeating Sania Mirza 1–6, 6–4, 6–4 in the final.

Seeds

Draw

Finals

Top half

Bottom half

References
http://www.itftennis.com/procircuit/tournaments/women's-tournament/info.aspx?tournamentid=1100020105

Odlum Brown Vancouver Open
Vancouver Open